Deer Lodge County is a county in the U.S. state of Montana. As of the 2020 census, the population was 9,421. It forms a consolidated city-county government with its county seat of Anaconda. The county was established in 1865.

History

Deer Lodge was one of the original 9 Montana counties, as constituted with the establishment of Montana Territory in 1864. The original county included what are now Silver Bow County (separated in 1881), Deer Lodge County, Granite County (separated in 1893) and Powell County (separated in 1901).

Geography
It is the second-smallest county in Montana by area.

The county has a wealth of natural amenities, such as the Anaconda Mountain Range, Georgetown Lake, and the Mount Haggin wildlife management area (Montana's largest at 54,000 acres).

Major highways

  Interstate 90
  U.S. Highway 10 (Former)
  Montana Highway 1
  Montana Highway 43
  Montana Highway 48

Adjacent counties

 Granite County - northwest
 Powell County - north
 Jefferson County - east
 Silver Bow County - southeast
 Beaverhead County - south
 Ravalli County - west

National protected areas
 Beaverhead National Forest (part)
 Deerlodge National Forest (part)

Demographics

2000 census
As of the 2000 United States census, there were 9,417 people, 3,995 households, and 2,524 families living in the county. The population density was 13 people per square mile (5/km2). There were 4,958 housing units at an average density of 7 per square mile (3/km2). The racial makeup of the county was 95.87% White, 0.17% Black or African American, 1.77% Native American, 0.36% Asian, 0.01% Pacific Islander, 0.18% from other races, and 1.64% from two or more races. 1.65% of the population were Hispanic or Latino of any race. 21.3% were of Irish, 21.2% German, 7.1% English, 6.5% American and 6.4% Norwegian ancestry. 96.3% spoke English, 1.4% Spanish and 1.2% German as their first language.

There were 3,995 households, out of which 25.80% had children under the age of 18 living with them, 50.00% were married couples living together, 9.40% had a female householder with no husband present, and 36.80% were non-families. 33.40% of all households were made up of individuals, and 16.70% had someone living alone who was 65 years of age or older. The average household size was 2.26 and the average family size was 2.84.

The county population contained 22.50% under the age of 18, 7.90% from 18 to 24, 24.00% from 25 to 44, 26.80% from 45 to 64, and 18.80% who were 65 years of age or older. The median age was 42 years. For every 100 females there were 99.80 males. For every 100 females age 18 and over, there were 97.30 males.

The median income for a household in the county was $26,305, and the median income for a family was $36,158. Males had a median income of $27,230 versus $18,719 for females. The per capita income for the county was $15,580. About 11.60% of families and 15.80% of the population were below the poverty line, including 21.40% of those under age 18 and 9.80% of those age 65 or over.

2010 census
As of the 2010 United States census, there were 9,298 people, 4,018 households, and 2,350 families living in the county. The racial makeup of the county was 93.1% white, 3.1% American Indian, 0.4% black or African American, 0.3% Asian, 0.5% from other races, and 2.5% from two or more races. Those of Hispanic or Latino origin made up 2.9% of the population. In terms of ancestry, 30.2% were German, 26.2% were Irish, 9.2% were English, 8.5% were Norwegian, 5.9% were Italian, 5.2% were Swedish, and 2.6% were American.

Of the 4,018 households, 22.3% had children under the age of 18 living with them, 44.8% were married couples living together, 9.2% had a female householder with no husband present, 41.5% were non-families, and 36.1% of all households were made up of individuals. The average household size was 2.11 and the average family size was 2.73. The median age was 46.0 years.

The median income for a household in the county was $35,310 and the median income for a family was $51,076. Males had a median income of $32,477 versus $26,250 for females. The per capita income for the county was $21,921. About 9.6% of families and 21.2% of the population were below the poverty line, including 30.6% of those under age 18 and 6.9% of those age 65 or over.

Government and politics
Deer Lodge County is the most consistently Democratic county in Montana when it comes to presidential elections. It has not supported a Republican candidate since Calvin Coolidge in 1924. In the last five elections the Democratic candidate has won by 21% to nearly 49% of Deer Lodge County's vote. However, in 2016, Hillary Clinton failed to garner a majority of the votes. This was the first time a Democrat had not obtained a majority since 1924. In gubernatorial elections the last most recent Republican to carry the county was Marc Racicot in the 1996 election. In that election the original Democratic nominee, Chet Blaylock, died and Marc Racicot carried every county.

It is currently in the 43rd district of the Montana Senate and as such has been represented by Democrat Jesse Laslovich since 2004. In the Montana House of Representatives it is in the 85th district and as such has been represented by Democrat Cynthia Hiner since 2004.

Communities

City
 Anaconda

Unincorporated communities
 Galen
 Georgetown
 Opportunity
 Warm Springs
Note: the town of Deer Lodge is in neighboring Powell County.

Notable people

 Lucille Ball – actress and television star, most notably on I Love Lucy
 John H. Collins – classical scholar.
 Frank Cope – New York Giants offensive lineman
 Marcus Daly – founder of Anaconda, and one of the "Copper Kings" of Butte.
 Wayne Estes – college basketball star
 Raymond Hunthausen – Archbishop of Seattle
 Rob Johnson – San Diego Padres catcher
 Nancy Keenan – politician, NARAL president
 George A. Lingo – politician in the Alaska Territory
 Roger Rouse – Professional Boxer
 George Leo Thomas – Roman Catholic Bishop of Helena
 Lester Thurow – economist
 John H. Tolan – later a United States Congressman from California, was an attorney of the county from 1904 through 1906.

See also
 Atlantic Cable Quartz Lode
 List of lakes in Deer Lodge County, Montana
 List of mountains in Deer Lodge County, Montana
 National Register of Historic Places listings in Deer Lodge County, Montana

References

Sources

External links

 Anaconda and Deer Lodge Local News

 
1865 establishments in Montana Territory
Populated places established in 1865